Alexander Wilson Jackson (2 October 1921 – 22 May 2010), generally known as Alex Jackson or Alec Jackson, was a Scottish professional footballer who played as a half-back, an inside forward or a winger in the Football League for York City, in non-League football for Goole Town and was on the books of Crewe Alexandra and Huddersfield Town without making a league appearance. He died in the City of Campbelltown, South Australia in May 2010 at the age of 88.

References

1921 births
2010 deaths
Association football inside forwards
Association football utility players
Association football wing halves
Association football wingers
Crewe Alexandra F.C. players
English Football League players
Goole Town F.C. players
Huddersfield Town A.F.C. players
People from Lesmahagow
Scottish footballers
York City F.C. players
British expatriates in Australia